German submarine U-755 was a German Type VIIC submarine U-boat built for Nazi Germany's Kriegsmarine for service during World War II. Under the command of Kapitänleutnant Walter Göing. U-755 served with 9th U-boat Flotilla in the Atlantic, and later with 29th U-boat Flotilla operated in the Mediterranean Sea.

Design
German Type VIIC submarines were preceded by the shorter Type VIIB submarines. U-755 had a displacement of  when at the surface and  while submerged. She had two shafts and two  propellers.

U-755 was fitted with five  torpedo tubes (four fitted at the bow and one at the stern), fourteen torpedoes, one  SK C/35 naval gun, 220 rounds, and a  C/30 anti-aircraft gun. The boat had a complement of between forty-four and sixty.

Service history
Work on U-755 began on 11 January 1940 at the Kriegsmarinewerft in Wilhelmshaven. She was commissioned on 3 November 1941, under the command of Kapitänleutnant Walter Göin and trained with 5th U-Boat Flotilla until 31 July 1942.

First and second patrols
Serving with 9th U-boat Flotilla, she served in two patrols. On 9 September 1942 – thirty-four days into her first patrol- U-755 sank her first ship. Of the 121 on board, all were killed. U-755 docked at Brest on 6 October, after sixty-four days at sea.

On 1 November, U-755 began travelling from Brest to La Spezia in Italy, after a further twenty-two days at sea.

Third patrol
On 1 December 1942, U-755 was transferred from 9th U-boat Flotilla, to 29th U-boat Flotilla. She began her twenty-five-day-long third voyage on 27 January 1943. She returned to La Spezia from Algeria on 20 February.

Fourth patrol
U-755 set out on her fourth patrol on 21 March 1943, where she was to head to Morocco, and then to Toulon, in Vichy France. At 02:07 on 26 March 1943, U-755 fired three torpedoes at a convoy north of Ceuta and confirmed a hit in the bow of FFL Sergent Gouarne (P-43), which broke in two and sank in approximately ninety seconds, killing five of its nineteen-man complement. The U-boat attacked the same convoy with another spread of three torpedoes at 04.13 hours and reported a hit after 12 minutes, but this was probably an end-of-run detonation.

On 2 April 1943, the French trawler Simon Duhamel II was spotted off Cape d´Alboran, some time after 06:00, after straggling from convoy TE-20 due to a problem with her engines. U-755 fired at the trawler at 06:24, with one confirmed hit to the midship. This hit caused an explosion that broke the vessel apart, sinking in a mere four minutes. Only one man of her fifty-three-man crew survived, being rescued two days later.

Fifth patrol
On 18 May, U-755 set sail from Toulon on her fifth, and last patrol. Two days in, she was attacked by the British submarine , but the fired torpedoes missed.

The aircraft was hit in the port engine by AA fire during the first attack run, but dropped three depth charges. The damaged engine then forced the pilot to return to base. Strafing had killed one crewman and wounded two others on U-755, which was forced to return to port due to heavy damage.

Fate
She was eventually sunk on 28 May 1943, north-west of Mallorca, in position , by rockets from a RAF Hudson aircraft. Of her complement of forty, only nine crewmen survived, her commander was not one of them.

Wolfpacks
U-755 took part in five wolfpacks, namely:
 Lohs (11 August – 22 September 1942) 
 Blitz (22 – 26 September 1942) 
 Tiger (26 – 30 September 1942) 
 Luchs (1 – 2 October 1942) 
 Delphin (4 – 14 November 1942)

Summary of raiding history

References

Bibliography

External links

U-boats commissioned in 1941
1941 ships
Ships built in Wilhelmshaven
U-boats sunk in 1943
World War II submarines of Germany
U-boats sunk by British aircraft
U-boats sunk by depth charges
World War II shipwrecks in the Mediterranean Sea
Shipwrecks of Spain
German Type VIIC submarines
Maritime incidents in May 1943